Dakarai Tucker (born May 13, 1994) is an American basketball player for Hapoel Galil Elyon of the Israeli Premier League. He played college basketball for the Utah Utes.

College career 
Tucker came to Utah from Serra High School in Gardena, California. As a freshman, Tucker came off the bench, averaging 11.1 minutes, 3.1 points, and 1.2 rebounds per game. He had season highs of 15 points, 5 rebounds, and 3 steals. As a sophomore, Tucker started 22 of the 33 games that season, averaging 6.8 points and 1.8 rebounds. Tucker was a Honorable Mention All-Academic Pac-12 selection.

As a junior, Tucker started 3 games, averaging 7.2 points and 2.4 rebounds per game, helping his team reach a record of 26–9, 2nd in the Pac-12. His senior year saw a decline in his minutes, as he went from 20.2 minutes per game as a junior to 18.5 minutes per game. He did not start in a single game, and averaged 5.4 points and 2.4 rebounds.

Professional career 
On October 31, 2016, Tucker tried out with the Salt Lake City Stars. After playing one game, in which he scored six points, he was placed on waivers.

On April 4, 2017, the Rio Grande Valley Vipers claimed Tucker, and played the remainder of the postseason with them. On October 20, 2018, Tucker returned to the Vipers, and played 49 games, starting in 22 of them. He averaged 13 points, 3.2 rebounds, and 1.6 assists per game. In 2019, Tucker played two games on the Phoenix Suns Summer League team.

On July 23, 2019, Tucker signed with Szolnoki Olajbányász of the Hungarian league. He averaged 15.6 points, 5.4 rebounds, and 1.8 assists per game. Tucker was selected 17th overall in the 2021 NBA G League draft by the Iowa Wolves. He averaged 11.1 points, 3.3 rebounds, 2.3 assists and 1.4 steals per game with the Wolves. On August 5, 2021, Tucker signed with Ironi Ramat Gan of the Liga Leumit.

On September 1, 2022, he has signed with Hapoel Galil Elyon of the Israeli Premier League.

Career statistics

College 

|-
| style="text-align:left;"| 2012–13
| style="text-align:left;"| Utah
| 25 || 1 || 11.1 || .508 || .394 || .600 || 1.2 || 0.4 || 0.4 || 0.2 || 3.1
|-
| style="text-align:left;"| 2013–14
| style="text-align:left;"| Utah
| 33 || 22 || 20.1 || .435 || .392 || .850 || 1.8 || 0.8 || 0.3 || 0.1 || 6.8
|-
| style="text-align:left;"| 2014–15
| style="text-align:left;"| Utah
| 31 || 3 || 20.2 || .437 || .360 || .818 || 2.4 || 0.6|| 0.4 || .0.3|| 7.2
|-
| style="text-align:left;"| 2015–16
| style="text-align:left;"| Utah
| 36 || 0 || 18.5 || .434 || .417 || .759 || 2.4 || 0.7 || 0.4 || 0.4 || 5.4
|- class="sortbottom"
| style="text-align:center;" colspan="2"| Career
| 125 || 26 || 17.9 || .443 || .390 || .796 || 2.0 || 0.6 || 0.4 || 0.4 || 5.7

References 

1994 births
Living people
American men's basketball players
American expatriate basketball people in Hungary
Basketball players from California
Iowa Wolves players
People from Gardena, California
Rio Grande Valley Vipers players
Salt Lake City Stars players
Shooting guards
Utah Utes men's basketball players